Are You Legally Married? is a 1919 American silent drama film directed by Robert Thornby and starring Lew Cody, Rosemary Theby and Roy Laidlaw.

Cast
 Lew Cody as 	John Stark
 Rosemary Theby as June Redding
 Nanon Welsh as 	Sue Redding
 Henry Woodward as Wayne Hearne
 H.J. Barrows as J.J. Redding
 Roy Laidlaw as 	Henry Martin

References

Bibliography
 Connelly, Robert B. The Silents: Silent Feature Films, 1910-36, Volume 40, Issue 2. December Press, 1998.

External links
 

1919 films
1919 drama films
1910s English-language films
American silent feature films
Silent American drama films
American black-and-white films
Films directed by Robert Thornby
1910s American films